The Bergen County Line is a commuter rail line and service owned and operated by New Jersey Transit in the U.S. state of New Jersey. The line loops off the Main Line between the Meadowlands and Glen Rock, with trains continuing in either direction along the Main Line. It is colored on NJT system maps in grey, and its symbol is a cattail, which are commonly found in the Meadowlands where the line runs.

Some trains of Metro-North Railroad's Port Jervis Line also operate over the line. The Norfolk Southern Railway provides freight service along the line via trackage rights.

As on the Main Line, trains are powered by diesel locomotives operated push-pull, consisting of Comet or MultiLevel coaches.

History

From a point in Secaucus, just south of the Hackensack River bridge near the former Harmon Cove station, to a point in East Rutherford north of the Rutherford station, the Bergen County Line uses the former Erie Railroad Main Line. This portion was opened in 1833 by the Paterson and Hudson River Railroad and leased by the New York and Erie Rail Road in 1852. The rest of the line, from East Rutherford north to Glen Rock, opened in 1881 as the Bergen County Railroad.

Until the late 1950s, the main function of the Erie's Bergen County Cutoff was as a freight (and long-distance express) bypass of the at-grade Main Line through Passaic. Commuter service was relatively minor. In 1963 the Lackawanna Boonton Branch up to Paterson (with a small portion of the Erie's Newark Branch) became the new Erie-Lackawanna Main Line. This was caused by the abandonment of the Main Line section through downtown Passaic and construction of Interstate 80 using the old Boonton Branch right-way in Paterson. The old Main Line east of Rutherford was now exclusively part of the Bergen County Line.

Prior to the opening of Secaucus Junction in 2003, Bergen County Line trains used a longer stretch of the old Erie Main Line in Secaucus, extending south to Croxton Yard and a merge with the former Lackawanna Boonton Branch. A curving track was built between the HX Draw at Hackensack River and the Main Line west of Secaucus Junction to allow Bergen County Line trains to use Secaucus Junction.

Secaucus train collision 

On February 9, 1996, a Bergen County Line train collided with a Main Line train killing 3 people and 162 were injured. It was the New York City area and New Jersey's worst train accident since the 1958 Newark Bay rail accident where at least 48 people died.

2007 Ridgewood Junction Derailment 

On February 21, 2007, a Bergen County Line train suffered a minor derailment after passing over an improperly repaired switch at Ridgewood Junction.

Service

West of Secaucus Junction, the Bergen County Line tracks diverge from the Main Line over a new right-of-way opened on December 15, 2003, connecting the Main Line with the Bergen County Line. During this stretch and traveling westbound, the Hackensack River is to the left, while industrial plants on Meadowlands Parkway are to the right. A former station, Harmon Cove, was located nearby along the old Erie right-of-way and served the high-rise apartments nearby between 1978 and 2003.

Soon the train joins the old Erie Main Line right-of-way and crosses the Hackensack over HX Bridge, a two-track bascule draw. For the next two miles, the train crosses the Meadowlands, under the New Jersey Turnpike western spur with the Meadowlands Sports Complex in East Rutherford visible in the distance to the right. Here, the track parallels Berrys Creek and eventually crosses it just before passing below Route 3.

Beyond Route 3, the landscape changes to industrial. Office buildings line the side of the track, some serviced by sidings. The Pascack Valley Line soon splits off to the right at Pascack Junction, and the train then crosses Route 17 and approaches the Rutherford station.

Soon, the tracks form the border of Carlstadt and Wallington. Presently the train passes Wood-Ridge and South Hackensack before reaching the Wesmont station, which opened on May 15, 2016. The train then swings left, crossing the Saddle River, and then right, into Garfield reaching the Garfield station.

The train continues northward through Garfield, passing homes, businesses, and Dahnerts Lake County Park before reaching the Plauderville station at Midland Avenue, the border between Garfield and neighboring Saddle Brook. Shortly after passing beneath U.S. Highway 46 the track becomes the border of Saddle Brook and Elmwood Park, once again crossing Midland Avenue. Interstate 80 passes above the train, which then crosses the Garden State Parkway. The Broadway station in Fair Lawn straddles a border formed by the track and Route 4.

In Fair Lawn, the line is paralleled by Plaza Road, named for Radburn Plaza, the commercial area serving the Radburn development for which the borough's more northerly station is named. The line crosses below Route 208 before reaching Radburn. Beyond the station, the train passes housing to the right and industry to the left, with a spur to a Nabisco plant. Next is the Glen Rock-Boro Hall station which like its Main Line counterpart is on Rock Road. The lines merge a short distance north of this point at Ridgewood Junction. The trains will continue north to either Waldwick or Suffern, and some peak trains will terminate at Ridgewood, which is the first station after the two lines join.

Stations

Bibliography

References

NJ Transit Rail Operations
Transportation in Bergen County, New Jersey
Erie Railroad
Transportation in Orange County, New York
Transportation in Rockland County, New York
Rail lines in Rockland County, New York
Erie Railroad lines